Below is a list of  National Football League offensive coordinators.

AFC

NFC

See also
 List of current National Football League head coaches
 List of current National Football League defensive coordinators

Offens